JK Revolution is the ninth studio album by Serbian singer Jelena Karleuša. Recorded between June and December 2007, it was released on February 7, 2008, through City Records. The album was entirely arranged and produced by Marko Peruničić and Nebojša Arežina from Atelje Trag. The lyrics are written by Marina Tucaković with the assistance from Ljiljana Jorgovanović. With shipments of 280,000 copies, JK Revolution is commercially the most successful album by Jelena Karleuša to date, as well as one of the highest-selling albums in Serbia in 21. century.

Track listing
Credits adapted from Discogs.

Sample credits
"Tihi ubica" contains a sample of "Se Esfuma Tu Amor" (2004) by Marc Anthony.
"Testament" contains a sample of "Torre De Babel" (2006) by David Bisbal featuring Wisin & Yandel.
"Ko ti to baje" contains a sample of "Aashiq Banaya Aapne" (2005) by Himesh Reshammiya and Shreya Ghoshal.
"Saki" contains a sample of "Saaki Saaki" (2004) by Sukhwinder Singh and Sunidhi Chauhan.
"Casino" contains a sample of "Hagiga" (2004) by Sarit Hadad.
"Jedna noć i kajanje" contains a sample of "Mon Pays" (2006) by Faudel Belloua.
"Pamet u glavu" contains a sample of "Smack My Bitch Up" (1997) by The Prodigy.
"Mala" contains a sample of "Mayya" (2006) by Maryem Tollar, Chinmayi and Keerthi Sagathia.
"Mala (Teatro Mix)" contains a sample of "No More Tears" (1979) by Barbra Streisand and Donna Summer.

Personnel
Credits adapted from the album's liner notes

Performers and musicians
Jelena Karleuša – vocals
Ceca Slavković - backing vocals 
Aleksandra Radović – backing vocals 
Marija Mihajlović – backing vocals 
Miki Element - backing vocals 
Dejan Momčilović – drums 
Vladimir Čukić - bass 
Zoran Petrović – guitar 
Bane Kljajić – guitar

Release history

References

2008 albums
Jelena Karleuša albums
City Records albums